Felipe Dias da Silva dal Belo, commonly known as Felipe (born 31 July 1984), is a Brazilian former professional footballer who played as a defender. He has spent his entire professional career in Serie A.

Club career

Udinese 
Felipe began his career with Udinese Calcio, where he made his first team debut in April 2003. He has proven himself as a reliable central defender in Serie A, especially in the 2005–06 season for the club in the UEFA Champions League.

Felipe signed a new four-year contract with Udinese in March 2008 which would see him stay until 2012. He also signed an improved contract in November 2005.

In the 2006–07 season, Felipe missed the rest of the season after he was injured in January. He returned to the team in September 2007 and became one of the key players who helped Udinese qualify for the 2008–09 UEFA Cup. But another injury in March 2008 meant he would miss the rest of the season and he returned in November 2008. He played 6 matches in 2008–09 UEFA Cup, which he missed the front part of the tournament.

In the 2009–10 season, Felipe was not a regular; the coach preferred Andrea Coda and Cristian Zapata (who changed his role from fullback) as the central defensive pair. He only played 3 league matches.

Fiorentina 
A week before the opening of the transfer window, Felipe was allowed to train with ACF Fiorentina and have medical and aptitudinal tests to finalize a possible transfer on 28 December 2009.

On 2 January 2010, Felipe completed the transfer, signed a loan contract with option to purchase. The loan fee was €3 million. He made his debut for the Viola in a 5–1 away win to Siena. In June 2010 la Viola excised the rights to sign him for €6 million. After a disappointing performance, he was loaned out to Cesena on 31 January 2011. On 21 August 2012, he was signed by Siena.

Internazionale 
After being released from Parma, Felipe joined Internazionale on 26 February 2015, on a six-month deal, he will wear shirt no 26.

Return to Udinese

Career statistics

References

External links 
 Profile Football.it 

1984 births
Living people
People from Guaratinguetá
Association football central defenders
Brazilian footballers
Udinese Calcio players
ACF Fiorentina players
A.C. Cesena players
A.C.N. Siena 1904 players
Parma Calcio 1913 players
Inter Milan players
S.P.A.L. players
Serie A players
Brazilian expatriate footballers
Expatriate footballers in Italy
Brazilian expatriate sportspeople in Italy
Footballers from São Paulo (state)